Ashley-Paul Emmanuel Robinson (born 5 December 1989) is an English footballer who plays for AFC Whyteleafe. He lives in New Addington, Croydon and attended Kelsey Park Sports College, Beckenham.

Starting out
He joined the Crystal Palace academy at the age of 14, and played on the right wing or in attack. He made his debut for the Eagles in March near the back-end of the 2007-08 season, making six substitute appearances for Neil Warnock's side, which included one assist in the Colchester United game in 2008.

Trials
Robinson then secured a trial with Premier League side Fulham.

After this he had other trials at League One sides Hereford United and Carlisle United. They both decided not to sign him and instead he eventually signed for Bromley on 15 October 2008.

In the 2009–10 season he played for various clubs: Harlow Town, Concord Rangers and Dulwich Hamlet.

In the 2010–11 season he played for Eastbourne Town, Hastings United, Horsham FC and Tooting & Mitcham F.C.

In June 2014, Robinson re-signed for Dulwich Hamlet - however, after playing in several pre-season friendlies, Robinson didn't make the match-day squad for the first two games of the season, and it was subsequently announced he had been released by Dulwich Hamlet, and re-signed with Tooting & Mitcham.

Following a brief spell with Tooting & Mitcham, Robinson moved on to Bognor Regis, and then Hastings United.

Club career statistics
(correct as of 15 October 2008)

References

External links
Match Report of debut v Preston
Ashley Robinson profile at cpfc.co.uk

1989 births
Living people
English footballers
Association football forwards
Crystal Palace F.C. players
Bromley F.C. players
Dulwich Hamlet F.C. players
Horsham F.C. players
Hastings United F.C. players
Tooting & Mitcham United F.C. players
English Football League players